Holbrook High School may refer to one of the following:

Holbrook High School (England), Ipswich, Suffolk
Holbrook High School (Arizona), Holbrook, Arizona